Route 219 is a provincial highway located in the Montérégie region of Quebec south of Montreal. It starts at the Mooers-Hemmingford Border Crossing south of Hemmingford and ends in Saint-Jean-sur-Richelieu. 

The highway starts at the border continuing from the former north terminus of NY 22 south of Hemmingford and north of Mooers, New York, from there it goes North through the Village and Township of Hemmingford toward Saint-Patrice-de-Sherrington. There it turns east for a 9 km concurrency with Route 221 until Napierville, where again it goes north alongside the L'Acadie River until reaching the former municipality of L'Acadie, where it turns eastward toward its terminus at a junction with Autoroute 35 in Saint-Jean-sur-Richelieu.

Municipalities along Route 219

 Hemmingford Township
 Hemmingford Village
 Saint-Patrice-de-Sherrington
 Saint-Cyprien-de-Napierville
 Napierville
 Saint-Jean-sur-Richelieu

Major intersections

See also

 List of Quebec provincial highways

References

External links 
 Official Transport Quebec Road Map 
 Route 219 on Google Maps

219
Transport in Saint-Jean-sur-Richelieu